Edgar Addison Bancroft (November 20, 1857 – July 28, 1925) was an American lawyer and diplomat.  He served as United States Ambassador to Japan from 1924 to 1925.

Early life
Bancroft was born in Galesburg, Illinois. He was educated at Knox College and the Columbia University Law School.

His brother, Frederic, was a noted historian. He was also related to Aaron Bancroft, a biographer of George Washington, and to George Bancroft, a diplomat and historian.

Career
Bancroft was counsel for the Santa Fe Railway and the International Harvester Co. In 1919 he was appointed to the Chicago Commission on Race Relations.

President Calvin Coolidge named him Ambassador to Japan during a recess of the Senate on September 23, 1924. Ambassador Bancroft presented his credentials to the Japanese government on November 19, 1924.  His appointment was subsequently confirmed by the Senate on January 21, 1925.

Ambassador Bancroft died in Karuizawa, Japan on July 28, 1925. As a gesture of good-will, the Japanese government sent the light cruiser  to San Pedro in California with his remains.

Selected works
In a statistical overview derived from writings by and about Edgar Bancroft, OCLC/WorldCat encompasses roughly 40+ works in 50+ publications in two languages and 200+ library holdings.

 The Chicago Strike of 1894 (1895)
 The Moral Sentiment of the People: the Index and Foundation of National Greatnes (1896)
 The Sherman Law and Recent Decisions (1911)
 In Memoriam Robert Mather 1859-1911 (1912)
 Doctor Gunsaulus, the citizen (1921)
 The Mission of America and Other War-Time Speeches of Edgar A. Bancroft (1922)
 Speeches and Addresses of His Excellency the Late Edgar A. Bancroft, American Ambassador and Honorary President of the America-Japan Society (1926)
 The Mission of America, and Other War-Time Speeches of Edgar A. Bancroft (1927)

Notes

References

External links
 

1857 births
1925 deaths
United States Department of State officials
Ambassadors of the United States to Japan
Columbia Law School alumni
Knox College (Illinois) alumni
20th-century American diplomats